Presidential elections were held in the Republic of the Congo in August 1992, marking the end of the transitional period that began with the February–June 1991 National Conference. It was won by Pascal Lissouba of the Pan-African Union for Social Democracy (UPADS), who defeated Bernard Kolélas of the Congolese Movement for Democracy and Integral Development (MCDDI) in a second round of voting.

In the first round, held on 8 August, Lissouba, who had served as Prime Minister in the 1960s, placed first with 36% of the vote, outperforming Kolélas, an opposition figure since the 1960s, who won 20%, and Denis Sassou-Nguesso of the former ruling party, the Congolese Labor Party (PCT), who won 17%. Sassou-Nguesso had been President since 1979 but only in a ceremonial capacity since the National Conference. Prime Minister André Milongo, who led the country during the transition but whose government had lost its responsibility for organizing the election after the local election of May 1992 proved controversial, ran as an independent candidate and placed fourth with 10%. Two former leading figures of the PCT, Jean-Pierre Thystère Tchicaya of the Rally for Democracy and Social Progress (RDPS) and Joachim Yhombi-Opango of the Rally for Democracy and Development (RDD), placed fifth and sixth with 6% and 3% respectively.

In the first round, Lissouba enjoyed overwhelming support in the three regions collectively known as Nibolek—Niari (88.7%), Bouenza (80.6%), and Lékoumou (91.7%). Kolélas won a first round majority only in the Pool Region (64.4%), although he also won a plurality in Brazzaville, the capital (29.9%). Sassou-Nguesso dominated the north, winning first round majorities in Plateaux (57.6%) and Likouala (58.5%) and pluralities in Cuvette (47.9%) and Sangha (41.9%). Tchicaya and Yhombi-Opango made strong showings in certain regions—the former won 28% of the vote (behind Lissouba's 40%) in Kouilou Region, which includes Pointe-Noire, the country's second largest city, and the latter won 27% of the vote in Cuvette Region.

With Sassou-Nguesso's support, Lissouba defeated Kolélas in the second round with 61% of the vote. Lissouba won all regions in the second round except Brazzaville, Pool, and Kouilou.

Results
The official number of valid votes cast in the first round was reported to be 785,981, 1,900 higher than the total of votes received by each candidate. Voter turnout was reported to be 59.6% based on this figure.

References

Presidential elections in the Republic of the Congo
Congo
Election, President